Old Korean is the first historically documented stage of the Korean language, typified by the language of the Unified Silla period (668–935).

The boundaries of Old Korean periodization remain in dispute. Some linguists classify the sparsely attested languages of the Three Kingdoms of Korea as variants of Old Korean, while others reserve the term for the language of Silla alone. Old Korean traditionally ends with the fall of Silla in 935. This too has recently been challenged by South Korean linguists who argue for extending the Old Korean period to the mid-thirteenth century, although this new periodization is not yet fully accepted. This article focuses on the language of Silla before the tenth century.

Old Korean is poorly attested. The only surviving literary works are a little more than a dozen vernacular poems called hyangga. Hyangga use hyangchal writing. Other sources include inscriptions on steles and wooden tablets, glosses to Buddhist sutras, and the transcription of personal and place names in works otherwise in Classical Chinese. All methods of Old Korean writing rely on logographic Chinese characters, used to either gloss the meaning or approximate the sound of the Korean words. The phonetic value of surviving Old Korean texts is thus opaque.

Due to the paucity and poor quality of sources, modern linguists have "little more than a vague outline" of the characteristics of Old Korean. Its phoneme inventory seems to have included fewer consonants but more vowels than Middle Korean. In its typology, it was a subject-object-verb, agglutinative language, like both Middle and Modern Korean. However, Old Korean is thought to have differed from its descendants in certain typological features, including the existence of clausal nominalization and the ability of inflecting verb roots to appear in isolation.

Despite attempts to link the language to the putative Altaic family and especially to the Japonic languages, no links between Old Korean and any non-Koreanic language have been uncontroversially demonstrated.

History and periodization 

Old Korean is generally defined as the ancient Koreanic language of the Silla state (BCE 57–CE 936), especially in its Unified period (668–936). Proto-Korean, the hypothetical ancestor of the Koreanic languages understood largely through the internal reconstruction of later forms of Korean, is to be distinguished from the actually historically attested language of Old Korean.

Old Korean semantic influence may be present in even the oldest discovered Silla inscription, a Classical Chinese-language stele dated to 441 or 501. Korean syntax and morphemes are visibly attested for the first time in Silla texts of the mid- to late-sixth century, and the use of such vernacular elements becomes more extensive by the Unified period.

Initially only one of the Three Kingdoms of Korea, Silla rose to ascendancy in the sixth century under monarchs Beopheung and Jinheung. After another century of conflict, the kings of Silla allied with Tang China to destroy the other two kingdoms—Baekje in 660, and Goguryeo in 668—and to unite the southern two-thirds of the Korean Peninsula under their rule. This political consolidation allowed the language of Silla to become the lingua franca of the peninsula and ultimately drove the languages of Baekje and Goguryeo to extinction, leaving the latter only as substrata in later Korean dialects. Middle Korean, and hence Modern Korean, are thus direct descendants of the Old Korean language of Silla.

Little data on the languages of the other two kingdoms survive, but most linguists agree that both were related to the language of Silla. Opinion differs as to whether to classify the Goguryeo and Baekje languages as Old Korean variants, or as related but independent languages. Lee Ki-Moon and S. Roberts Ramsey argue in 2011 that evidence for mutual intelligibility is insufficient, and that linguists ought to "treat the fragments of the three languages as representing three separate corpora". Earlier in 2000, Ramsey and Iksop Lee note that the three languages are often grouped as Old Korean, but point to "obvious dissimilarities" and identify Sillan as Old Korean "in the truest sense". Nam Pung-hyun and Alexander Vovin, on the other hand, classify the languages of all three kingdoms as regional dialects of Old Korean. Other linguists, such as Lee Seungjae, group the languages of Silla and Baekje together as Old Korean while excluding that of Goguryeo. The LINGUIST List gives Silla as a synonym for Old Korean while acknowledging that the term is "often used to refer to three distinct languages".

Silla began a protracted decline in the late eighth century. By the early tenth century, the Korean Peninsula was once more divided into three warring polities: the rump Silla state, and two new kingdoms founded by local magnates. Goryeo, one of the latter, obtained the surrender of the Silla court in 935 and reunited the country the next year. Korea's political and cultural center henceforth became the Goryeo capital of Gaegyeong (modern Gaeseong), located in central Korea. The prestige dialect of Korean also shifted from the language of Silla's southeastern heartland to the central dialect of Gaegyeong during this time. Following Lee Ki-Moon's work in the 1970s, the end of Old Korean is traditionally associated with this tenth-century change in the country's political center.

In 2003, South Korean linguist Nam Pung-hyun proposed that the Old Korean period should be extended into the mid-thirteenth century. Nam's arguments center on Korean-language glosses to the Buddhist canon. He identifies grammatical commonalities between Silla-period texts and glosses from before the thirteenth century, which contrast with the structures of post-thirteenth century glosses and of fifteenth-century Middle Korean. Such thirteenth-century changes include the invention of dedicated conditional mood markers, the restriction of the former nominalizing suffixes -n and -l to attributive functions alone, the erasing of distinctions between nominal and verbal negation, and the loss of the essentiality-marking suffix -ms.

Nam's thesis has been increasingly influential in Korean academia. In a 2012 review, Kim Yupum notes that "recent studies have a tendency to make the thirteenth century the end date [for Old Korean]... One thinks that the general periodization of Korean language history, in which [only the language] prior to the founding of Goryeo is considered Old Korean, is in need of revision." The Russian-American linguist Alexander Vovin also considers twelfth-century data to be examples of "Late Old Korean". On the other hand, linguists such as Lee Seungjae and Hwang Seon-yeop continue to use the older periodization, as do major recent English-language sources such as the 2011 History of the Korean Language and the 2015 Blackwell Handbook of Korean Linguistics.

Sources of Old Korean

Hyangga literature 

The only Korean-language literature that survives from Silla are vernacular poems now called hyangga, literally "local songs".

Hyangga appears to have been a flourishing genre in the Silla period, with a royally commissioned anthology published in 888. That anthology is now lost, and only twenty-five works survive. Fourteen are recorded in the Samguk yusa, a history compiled in the 1280s by the monk Iryeon, along with prose introductions that detail how the poem came to be composed. These introductions date the works to between 600 and 879. The majority of Samguk yusa poems, however, are from the eighth century. Eleven additional hyangga, composed in the 960s by the Buddhist monk Gyunyeo, are preserved in a 1075 biography of the master. Lee Ki-Moon and Ramsey consider Gyunyeo's hyangga to also represent "Silla poetry", although Nam Pung-hyun insists on significant grammatical differences between the works of the Samguk yusa and those of Gyunyeo.

Because centuries passed between the composition of hyangga works and the compilation of the works where they now survive, textual corruption may have occurred. Some poems that Iryeon attributes to the Silla period are now believed to be Goryeo-era works. Nam Pung-hyun nevertheless considers most of the Samguk yusa poems to be reliable sources for Old Korean because Iryeon would have learned the Buddhist canon through a "very conservative" dialect and thus fully understood the Silla language. Other scholars, such as Park Yongsik, point to thirteenth-century grammatical elements in the poems while acknowledging that the overall framework of the hyangga texts is Old Korean.

The hyangga could no longer be read by the Joseon period (1392–1910). The modern study of Old Korean poetry began with Japanese scholars during the Japanese colonial period (1910–1945), with Shinpei Ogura pioneering the first reconstructions of all twenty-five hyangga in 1929. The earliest reconstructions by a Korean scholar were made by Yang Chu-dong in 1942 and corrected many of Ogura's errors, for instance properly identifying  as a phonogram for *-k. The analyses of Kim Wan-jin in 1980 established many general principles of hyangga orthography. Interpretations of hyangga after the 1990s, such as those of Nam Pung-hyun in the 2010s, draw on new understandings of early Korean grammar provided by newly discovered Goryeo texts.

Nevertheless, many poems remain poorly understood, and their phonology is particularly unclear. Due to the opaqueness of data, it has been convention since the earliest Japanese researchers for scholars to transcribe their hyangga reconstructions using the Middle Korean lexicon, and some linguists continue to anachronistically project even non-lexical Middle Korean elements in their analyses.

Epigraphic sources 

Silla inscriptions also document Old Korean elements. Idiosyncratic Chinese vocabulary suggestive of vernacular influence is found even in the oldest surviving Silla inscription, a stele in Pohang dated to either 441 or 501. These early inscriptions, however, involved "little more than subtle alterations of Classical Chinese syntax".

Inscriptions of the sixth and seventh centuries show more fully developed strategies of representing Korean with Chinese characters. Some inscriptions represent functional morphemes directly through semantic Chinese equivalents. Others use only Classical Chinese vocabulary, but reorder them fully according to Korean syntax. "build begin") rather than the correct Classical Chinese,  (lit. "begin build"), reflecting the Subject-object-verb word order of Korean. The Imsin Vow Stone, raised in either 552 or 612, is also illustrative:

Other sixth-century epigraphs that arrange Chinese vocabulary using Korean syntax and employ Chinese semantic equivalents for certain Korean functional morphemes have been discovered, including stelae bearing royal edicts or celebrating public works and sixth-century rock inscriptions left at Ulju by royals on tour. Some inscriptions of the Unified Silla period continue to use only words from Classical Chinese, even as they order them according to Korean grammar. However, most inscriptions of the period write Old Korean morphemes more explicitly, relying on Chinese semantic and phonetic equivalents. These Unified-era inscriptions are often Buddhist in nature and include material carved on Buddha statues, temple bells, and pagodas.

Mokgan sources 

Ancient Korean scribes often wrote on bamboo and wooden slips called mokgan. By 2016, archaeologists had discovered 647 mokgan, out of which 431 slips were from Silla. Mokgan are valuable primary sources because they were largely written by and reflect the concerns of low-ranking officials, unlike other texts that are dominated by the high elite. Since the majority of discovered texts are inventories of products, they also provide otherwise rare information about numerals, classifiers, and common nouns.

Modern mokgan research began in 1975. With the development of infrared imaging science in the 1990s, it became possible to read many formerly indecipherable texts, and a comprehensive catalog of hitherto discovered slips was published in 2004. Since its publication, scholars have actively relied on the mokgan data as an important primary source.

Mokgan are classified into two general categories. Most surviving slips are tag mokgan, which were attached to goods during transport and contain quantitative data about the product in question. Document mokgan, on the other hand, contain administrative reports by local officials. Document mokgan of extended length were common prior to Silla's conquest of the other kingdoms, but mokgan of the Unified period are primarily tag mokgan. A small number of texts belong to neither group; these include a fragmentary hyangga poem discovered in 2000 and what may be a ritual text associated with Dragon King worship.

The earliest direct attestation of Old Korean comes from a mid-sixth century document mokgan first deciphered in full by Lee Seungjae in 2017. This slip, which contains a report by a village chieftain to a higher-ranking official, is composed according to Korean syntax and includes four uncontroversial examples of Old Korean functional morphemes (given below in bold), as well as several potential content words.

Other textual sources 

Old Korean glosses have been discovered on eighth-century editions of Chinese-language Buddhist works. Similar to the Japanese kanbun tradition, these glosses provide Old Korean noun case markers, inflectional suffixes, and phonograms that would have helped Korean learners read out the Classical Chinese text in their own language. Examples of these three uses of glossing found in a 740 edition of the Avatamsaka Sutra (now preserved in Tōdai-ji, Japan) are given below.

Portions of a Silla census register with Old Korean elements, likely from 755 but possibly also 695, 815, or 875, have also been discovered at Tōdai-ji.

Though in Classical Chinese, the Korean histories Samguk sagi and Samguk yusa offer Old Korean etymologies for certain native terms. The reliability of these etymologies remains in dispute.

Non-Korean texts also provide information on Old Korean. A passage of the Book of Liang, a seventh-century Chinese history, transcribes seven Silla words: a term for "fortification", two terms for "village", and four clothing-related terms. Three of the clothing words have Middle Korean cognates, but the other four words remain "uninterpretable". The eighth-century Japanese history Nihon Shoki also preserves a single sentence in the Silla language, apparently some sort of oath, although its meaning can only be guessed from context.

Proper nouns 

The Samguk sagi, the Samguk yusa, and Chinese and Japanese sources transcribe many proper nouns from Silla, including personal names, place names, and titles. These are often given in two variant forms: one that transcribes the Old Korean phonemes, using Chinese characters as phonograms, and one that translates the Old Korean morphemes, using Chinese characters as logograms. This is especially true for place names; they were standardized by royal decree in 757, but the sources preserve forms from both before and after this date. By comparing the two, linguists can infer the value of many Old Korean morphemes.

Non-textual sources 

The modern Korean language has its own pronunciations for Chinese characters, called Sino-Korean. Although some Sino-Korean forms reflect Old Chinese or Early Mandarin pronunciations, the majority of modern linguists believe that the dominant layer of Sino-Korean descends from the Middle Chinese prestige dialect of Chang'an during the Tang dynasty.

As Sino-Korean originates in Old Korean speakers' perception of Middle Chinese phones, elements of Old Korean phonology may be inferred from a comparison of Sino-Korean with Middle Chinese. For instance, Middle Chinese, Middle Korean, and Modern Korean all have a phonemic distinction between the non-aspirated velar stop  and its aspirated equivalent, . This suggests that  was absent in Old Korean.

Old Korean phonology can also be examined via Old Korean loanwords in other languages, including Middle Mongol and especially Old Japanese.

Orthography 

All Old Korean was written with Sinographic systems, where Chinese characters are borrowed for both their semantic and phonetic values to represent the vernacular language. The earliest texts with Old Korean elements use only Classical Chinese words, reordered to fit Korean syntax, and do not represent native morphemes directly. Eventually, Korean scribes developed four strategies to write their language with Chinese characters:

 Directly-adapted logograms (DALs or eumdokja 音讀字), used for all morphemes loaned from Classical Chinese and perceived as such. A character adapted as a DAL retains both the semantic and phonetic values of the original Chinese.
 Semantically-adapted logograms (SALs or hundokja 訓讀字), where native Korean morphemes, including loanwords perceived as native words, are written with Chinese semantic equivalents. A character adapted as a SAL retains only the semantic value of the original Chinese.
 Phonetically-adapted phonograms (PAPs or eumgaja 音假字), where native Korean morphemes, typically grammatical or semi-grammatical elements, are written with Chinese phonological equivalents. A character adapted as a PAP retains only the phonetic value of the original Chinese.
 Semantically-adapted phonograms (SAPs or hungaja 訓假字), where native Korean morphemes are written with a Chinese character whose Korean semantic equivalent is phonologically similar to the morpheme. A SAP retains neither the semantic nor the phonetic value of the Chinese.

It is often difficult to discern which of the transcription methods a certain character in a given text is using. For example, Nam 2019 gives the following interpretation of the final line of the hyangga poem Anmin-ga (756):

The text of this line uses all four strategies:
 The native Korean word  is written with a Chinese character having the same meaning (SAL).
 The Korean affixes  are spelled out using characters whose Sino-Korean reading contain those sounds (PAP).
 The Korean verb ending  is written with a Chinese character having the same meaning as * 'like', which is not attested but is presumably an ancestor of LMK  'to be like' (SAP).

In Old Korean, most content morphemes are written with SALs, while PAPs are used for functional suffixes. In Korean scholarship, this practice is called hunju eumjong, literally "logogram is principal, phonograms follow". In the eighth-century poem Heonhwa-ga given below, for instance, the inflected verb   begins with the SAL  "to give" and is followed by three PAPs and a final SAP that mark mood, aspect, and essentiality. Hunju eumjong is a defining characteristic of Silla orthography and appears not to be found in Baekje mokgan.

Another tendency of Old Korean writing is called mareum cheomgi, literally "final sounds transcribed in addition". A phonogram is used to mark the final syllable or coda consonant of a Korean word already represented by a logogram. Handel uses an analogy to "-st" in English 1st for "first". Because the final phonogram can represent a single consonant, Old Korean writing has alphabetic properties. Examples of mareum cheomgi are given below.

Unlike modern Sino-Korean, most of which descends from Middle Chinese, Old Korean phonograms were based on the Old Chinese pronunciation of characters. For instance, characters with Middle Chinese initial  were used to transcribe an Old Korean liquid, reflecting the fact that initial  arose from Old Chinese . The characters  and  had the same vowel in Old Korean orthography, which was true in Old Chinese where both had , but not in Middle Chinese, where the former had the diphthong  and the latter .

Partly because of this archaism, some of the most common Old Korean phonograms are only partially connected to the Middle Chinese or Sino-Korean phonetic value of the character. Ki-Moon Lee and S. Robert Ramsey cites six notable examples of these "problematic phonograms", given below.

Silla scribes also developed their own characters not found in China. These could be both logograms and phonograms, as seen in the examples below.

Korean Sinographic writing is traditionally classified into three major systems: idu, gugyeol, and hyangchal. The first, idu, was used primarily for translation. In its completed form after the Old Korean period, it involved reordering Classical Chinese text into Korean syntax and adding Korean functional morphemes as necessary, with the result that "a highly Sinicized formal form of written Korean" was produced. The gugyeol system was created to aid the comprehension of Classical Chinese texts by providing Korean glosses. It is divided into pre-thirteenth century interpretive gugyeol, where the glosses provide enough information to read the Chinese text in the Korean vernacular, and later consecutive gugyeol, which is insufficient for a full translation. Finally, hyangchal refers to the system used to write purely Old Korean texts without a Classical Chinese reference. However, Lee Ki-Moon and S. Robert Ramsey note that in the Old Korean period, idu and hyangchal were "different in intent" but involved the "same transcription strategies". Suh Jong-hak's 2011 review of the Korean scholarship also suggests that most modern Korean linguists consider the three to involve the "same concepts" and the main differences between them to be purpose rather than any structural difference.

Phonology 

The phonological system of Old Korean cannot be established "with any certainty", and its study relies largely on tracing back elements of Middle Korean (MK) phonology.

Prosody 

Fifteenth-century Middle Korean was a tonal or pitch accent language whose orthography distinguished between three tones: high, rising, and low. The rising tone is analyzed as a low tone followed by a high tone within a bimoraic syllable.

Middle Chinese was also a tonal language, with four tones: level, rising, departing, and entering. The tones of fifteenth-century Sino-Korean partially correspond to Middle Chinese ones. Chinese syllables with level tone have low tone in Middle Korean; those with rising or departing tones, rising tone; and those with entering tone, high tone. These correspondences suggest that Old Korean had some form of suprasegmentals consistent with those of Middle Chinese, perhaps a tonal system similar to that of Middle Korean. Phonetic glosses in Silla Buddhist texts show that as early as the eighth century, Sino-Korean involved three tonal categories and failed to distinguish rising and departing tones.

On the other hand, linguists such as Lee Ki-Moon and S. Roberts Ramsey argue that Old Korean originally had a simpler prosody than Middle Korean, and that influence from Chinese tones was among the reasons for Korean tonogenesis. The hypothesis that Old Korean originally lacked phonemic tone is supported by the fact that most Middle Korean nouns conform to a tonal pattern, the tendency for ancient Korean scribes to transcribe Old Korean proper nouns with Chinese level-tone characters, and the accent marks on Korean proper nouns given by the Japanese history Nihon Shoki, which suggest that ancient Koreans distinguished only the entering tone among the four Chinese tones.

Syllable structure 

Middle Korean had a complex syllable structure that allowed clusters of up to three consonants in initial and two consonants in terminal position, as well as vowel triphthongs. But many syllables with complex structures arose from the merger of multiple syllables, as seen below.

Middle Korean closed syllables with bimoraic "rising tone" reflect an originally bisyllabic CVCV form in which the final vowel was reduced, and some linguists propose that Old Korean or its precursor originally had a CV syllable structure like that of Japanese, with all clusters and coda consonants forming due to vowel reduction later on. However, there is strong evidence for the existence of coda consonants in even the earliest attestations of Korean, especially in mareum cheomgi orthography.

On the other hand, Middle Korean consonant clusters are believed not to have existed in Old Korean and to have formed after the twelfth century with the loss of intervening vowels. Old Korean thus had a simpler syllable structure than Middle Korean.

Consonants 

The consonant inventory of fifteenth-century Middle Korean is given here to help readers understand the following sections on Old Korean consonants. These are not the consonants of Old Korean, but of its fifteenth-century descendant.

Only nine consonants were permitted in the syllable coda.

Nasals 

Sino-Korean evidence suggests that there were no major differences between Old Korean and Middle Korean nasals.

Middle Chinese onset  is reflected in Sino-Korean as a null initial, while both Chinese and Korean transcriptions of Old Korean terms systematically avoid characters with onset . Middle Korean phonotactic restrictions on  thus seem to have held true for Old Korean as well.

The Samguk Sagi sometimes alternates between nasal-initial and liquid-initial characters in transcribing the same syllable of the same proper noun. This suggests that Old Korean may have had a sandhi rule in which nasals could become liquids, or vice versa, under certain circumstances.

Aspirate consonants 

The Middle Korean series of aspirated stops and affricates developed from mergers of consonant clusters involving /h/ or a velar obstruent, which in turn had formed from the loss of intervening vowels. To what extent this process had occurred in the Old Korean period is still debated.

Middle Chinese had a phonemic distinction between aspirated and unaspirated stops. This is reflected somewhat irregularly in Sino-Korean.

Silla scribes used the aspirate-initial characters only infrequently. When they did, the aspirates were often replaced with unaspirated equivalents. For instance, the 757 standardization of place names sometimes involved changing aspirated phonograms for unaspirated ones, or vice versa. This suggests that aspiration of any sort may have been absent in Old Korean, or that aspirate stops may have existed in free variation with unaspirated ones but were not distinct phonemes. On the other hand, Ki-Moon Lee and S. Roberts Ramsey argue that Silla orthography confirms the existence in Old Korean of at least the dental aspirates as phonemes.

Origin of MK /h/ 

Conversely, some instances of the Middle Chinese initial , usually loaned as Sino-Korean , are found as Sino-Korean . This may be because Koreans mistakenly assigned the same initial consonant to characters which do share a phonetic radical but in practice had different Middle Chinese initials. On the other hand, this may reflect a velar value for the Old Korean ancestor of Middle Korean . Korean scholars often propose an Old Korean velar fricative  as ancestral to Middle Korean .

Linguist Wei Guofeng suggests that the Old Korean phonemes  and  had overlapping distributions, with allophones such as  being shared by both phonemes. Alexander Vovin also argues via internal reconstruction that intervocalic  in earlier Korean lenited to Middle Korean .

Origin of MK lenited phonemes

Sibilants 

In some pre-Unified Silla transcriptions of Korean proper nouns, Chinese affricate and fricative sibilants appear interchangeable. The hyangga poems, however, differentiate affricates and fricatives consistently, while the Chinese distinction between the two is faithfully preserved in Sino-Korean phonology.

Liquids 

Old Korean, however, had two separate liquid phonemes. In Old Korean orthography, this first liquid phoneme was represented by the PAP , whose Old Chinese value was *l̥[ə]j, and the second phoneme by the PAP , whose Old Chinese value was *qrət.

According to Alexander Vovin, Lee Ki-Moon asserts that  represented  and that  represented . Vovin considers this claim "unacceptable" and "counterintuitive", especially given the reconstructed Old Chinese pronunciations of both characters, and suggests instead that  represented  while  stood for a rhotic. Ramsey and Nam Pung-hyun both agree with Vovin's hypothesis.

Coda consonants

Vowels

Grammar 

The case markers in Old Korean are the following:
{| class="wikitable"
|-
|Nominative case || 
|-
|Genitive case || , 
|-
|Accusative case || 
|-
|Dative case || ,  (in Idu script)
|-
|Instrumental case || 
|-
|Comitative case || 
|-
|}
Other affixes are:
{| class="wikitable"
|-
|Topic marker || 
|-
|Additive || 
|-
|Honorific || 
|-
|Humble || 
|}
The pronunciations written in parenthesis are from Middle Korean (中世國語, 중세국어). The letter ʌ is used to represent the pronunciation of "" (arae-a), which is obsolete in Modern Korean.

Vocabulary

Numerals 

Three Old Korean numerals are attested in the hyangga texts: those for one, two, and thousand. All three are found in the Docheonsugwaneum-ga, while the word for one is also attested identically in the Jemangmae-ga. The Cheoyong-ga uses a somewhat different form for "two", though it is unlikely to be authentically Silla. The mokgan data, discussed in Lee Seungjae 2017, suggests that multiples of ten may have been referred to with Chinese loanwords but that indigenous terms were used for single-digit numbers. Lee's work on mokgan yields Silla words for four of the latter: one, three, four, and five. The orthography of Old Korean numerals, in both hyangga and the mokgan texts, is marked by the hunju eumjong principle typical of Silla.

The Old Korean single-digit numerals are given with fifteenth-century and Modern Korean equivalents below. The Modern Korean terms used to refer to the ages of cattle, which Lee Seungjae considers more closely related to Old Korean forms, are also provided.

Relationship to other languages 

Some linguists suggest that Old Korean may form part of the now discredited language-family proposal Altaic languages, although this claim is controversial and not accepted by modern linguists. Another hypothesis says that Old Korean is related to the Japonic languages, but this claim is generally not accepted, either. A lesser known and obsolete hypothesis proposes a relationship to the Dravidian languages (see Dravido-Korean).

Sample text 

The Heonhwa-ga is a four-line hyangga from the early eighth century, preserved in the Samguk yusa. The Samguk yusa narrative recounts that Lady Suro, the beautiful wife of a local magistrate, once came upon a cliff a thousand zhang high topped by azalea blooms. Lady Suro asked if any of her entourage would pick her some of the azaleas, but none were willing. Upon hearing her words, however, an old man who had been leading a cow beside the cliff presented the flowers to her while singing the Heonhwa-ga. Nam Pung-hyun considers the song "of relatively easy interpretation" due to its short length, the context provided, and its consistent hunju eumjong orthography.

This article's reconstruction of the Heonhwa-ga follows the work of Nam 2010, partly translated into English by Nicolas Tranter in Nam 2012b. Nam's decipherment reproduces the grammar of Old Korean, but with Middle Korean values for Old Korean morphemes.  Elements in bold are phonograms.

NMR: nominalizer
INTENT: intentional mood
ESSEN: essentiality

Notes

References

Citations

Bibliography 

 
 
 
 
 
 
 
 
 
 
 
 
 
 
 
 
 
 
 
 
 
 
 
 
 
 
 
 
 
 
 
 
 
 
 
 
 
 
 
 
 
 
 
 
 
 
 
 
 
 
 
 
 
 
 
 
 
 
 
 
 
 
 
 
 
 
 
 
 
 
 
 

Languages attested from the 4th century
History of the Korean language
Goguryeo
Baekje
Silla
Korean, Old